Islamabad Capital Territory is located on the Pothohar Plateau where excavations have revealed evidence of a prehistoric culture. Relics and human skulls have been found dating back to 5000 BC that show this region was home to Neolithic people who settled on the banks of the Soan River, and developed small communities in the region at around 3000 BC. Islamabad's cultural heritage includes various archaeological sites, government buildings, shrines, stupas, landmarks, and national monuments. According to one survey by Quaid-i-Azam University in 2010, there are around 450 heritage sites in the capital territory and the adjoining Rawalpindi district. The Capital Development Authority formed a committee in 2011 to locate and preserve 150 of these historical and archaeological sites.

Following is an incomplete list of the cultural heritage sites in Islamabad Capital Territory.

|}

References

Archaeological sites in Pakistan
Buildings and structures in Islamabad
Cultural heritage sites in Islamabad